Schismatic may refer to:

 Schismatic (religion), a member of a religious schism, or, as an adjective, of or pertaining to a schism
 a term related to the Covenanters, a Scottish Presbyterian movement in the 17th century
 pertaining to the schisma in music
 Schismatic temperament

See also 
 Schism (disambiguation)
 Schismogenesis